Eastern Dedicated Freight Corridor or Eastern DFC is an under-construction broad gauge freight corridor in India. The railway will run between Ludhiana in Punjab and Dankuni (near Kolkata) in West Bengal via Khurja in Uttar Pradesh. This railway line is one of the multiple freight corridors being constructed by the Dedicated Freight Corridor Corporation of India (DFCCIL), a public-sector unit (PSU) under the Ministry of Railways. The Eastern DFC will mostly have double tracks and will be electrified, but the section from Ludhiana to Khurja (365 km) will be single line electrified due to lack of space. This freight corridor will cover a total distance of 1,839 km. This corridor is having a 46 km branch line which is joining Khurja (Bulandshahr district) on the Eastern DFC with Dadri (Gautam Buddha Nagar district) on the Western Dedicated Freight Corridor (Western DFC).

As of June 2022, 923 km or 50% of the Eastern DFC has been completed and 99% required land for these have been acquired. The Eastern DFC is expected to be complete by March 2023. 

First two DFCs, Western DFC, from Dadri, Uttar Pradesh to JNPT (Navi Mumbai) and Eastern DFC from Punjab to West Bengal, which will decongest railway network by moving 70% of India's goods trains to these two corridors, are both on track for completion in March 2023. However, due to the ongoing COVID-19 pandemic, which caused lockdowns, curfews and restrictions, it resulted in delays in work due to lack of labour.

Route

The freight corridor will cover first 447 km of Ludhiana - Dhari - Khurja section with single electrified track. After this the remaining line will be double track electrified up to Dankuni in West Bengal. This will pass through the important districts of Sahnewal, Doraha, Ludhiana, Sirhind, Rajpura, Ambala, Yamunanagar, Saharanpur, Muzaffarnagar, Meerut, Hapur, Bulandshahr, Aligarh, Hathras, Barhan, Tundla, Firozabad, Etawah, Kanpur, Prayagraj and Chandauli. To reduce load over the main line, this line will have many junctions. The proposed junctions on this line are Dhandharikalan, Sirhind, Rajpura, Khalanaur, Khurja, Daudkhan, Tundla, Bhaupur, Prempur, Karchhana, Jeonathpur, Mughalsarai Junction railway station, Ganjkhwaja, Sasaram, Dehri On Sone, Son Nagar, Gomoh, Andal, Bardhaman and Dankuni (The eastern terminal point).

Construction
This corridor is divided into multiple sections for contracting purposes.

Operations control center (OCC) 
Built by Alstom at Prayagraj, OCC will house command and control center to monitor all trains and power supply systems on Eastern Dedicated Freight Corridor. It will be staffed by 150 people and the facility is spread across 4.2 acres.

Status updates
 Apr 2005: Project announced by the then Prime Minister of India Manmohan Singh.
 Oct 2006: The Dedicated Freight Corridor Corporation of India (DFCCIL) is formed by the Ministry of Railways on 30 October 2006.
 Feb 2008: Cabinet Committee on Economic Affairs (CCEA) approves Western DFC and Eastern DFC.
 Sep 2009: Union Cabinet approved JICA loan. However, most of the loan is lost to corruption.
'2018-19 DFC is revived by Union government after a decade of inactivity, with target of going live by March, 2023. However, COVID crisis stalls the project progress and the timelines are shifted by a year. A major part of the project becomes operational by 2023.

See also
 Dedicated freight corridors in India
 Western Dedicated Freight Corridor
 Dedicated Freight Corridor Corporation of India
 High-speed rail in India

References

External links
 Eastern DFC 
 Map of Eastern Dedicated Freight Corridor
 Dedicated Freight Corridor Corporation of India (DFCCIL) Official link for project status 

Transport in Ludhiana
Dedicated freight corridors of India
Rail transport in Uttar Pradesh
Rail transport in Jharkhand
5 ft 6 in gauge railways in India
Transport in Kolkata